Gujarati is an Indo-Aryan language native to the Indian state of Gujarat and spoken predominantly by the Gujarati people. Gujarati is descended from Old Gujarati. In India, it is one of the 22  scheduled languages of the Union. It is also the official language in the state of Gujarat, as well as an official language in the union territory of Dadra and Nagar Haveli and Daman and Diu. As of 2011, Gujarati is the 6th most widely spoken language in India by number of native speakers, spoken by 55.5 million speakers which amounts to about 4.5% of the total Indian population. It is the 26th most widely spoken language in the world by number of native speakers as of  2007.

Outside of Gujarat, Gujarati is spoken in many other parts of South Asia by Gujarati migrants, especially in Mumbai and Pakistan (mainly in Karachi). Gujarati is also widely spoken in many countries outside South Asia by the Gujarati diaspora. In North America, Gujarati is one of the fastest-growing and most widely spoken Indian languages in the United States and Canada. In Europe, Gujaratis form the second largest of the British South Asian speech communities, and Gujarati is the fourth most commonly spoken language in the UK's capital London. Gujarati is also spoken in Southeast Africa, particularly in Kenya, Tanzania, Zambia, and South Africa. Elsewhere, Gujarati is spoken to a lesser extent in Hong Kong, Singapore, Australia, and Middle Eastern countries such as Bahrain and the United Arab Emirates.

History

Gujarati (sometimes spelled Gujerati, Gujarathi, Guzratee, Guujaratee, Gujrathi, and Gujerathi) is a modern Indo-Aryan (IA) language evolved from Sanskrit. The traditional practice is to differentiate the IA languages on the basis of three historical stages:
Old IA (Vedic and Classical Sanskrit)
Middle IA (various Prakrits and Apabhramshas)
New IA (modern languages such as Hindi, Punjabi, Bengali, etc.)
Another view postulates successive family tree splits, in which Gujarati is assumed to have separated from other IA languages in four stages:
IA languages split into Northern, Eastern, and Western divisions based on the innovate characteristics such as plosives becoming voiced in the Northern (Skt. danta "tooth" > Punj. dānd) and dental and retroflex sibilants merging with the palatal in the Eastern (Skt. sandhya  "evening" > Beng. śājh).
Western, into Central and Southern.
Central, in Gujarati/Rajasthani, Western Hindi, and Punjabi/Lahanda/Sindhi, on the basis of innovation of auxiliary verbs and postpositions in Gujarati/Rajasthani.
Gujarati/Rajasthani into Gujarati and Rajasthani through development of such characteristics as auxiliary ch- and the possessive marker -n- during the 15th century.

The principal changes from Sanskrit are the following:
Phonological
Loss of original phonemic length for vowels
Change of consonant clusters to geminate and then to single consonants (with compensatory vowel length)

Morphological
Reduction in the number of compounds
Merger of the dual with plural
Replacement of case affixes by postpositions
Development of periphrastic tense/voice/mood constructions
Syntax
Split ergativity
More complex agreement system
Gujarati is then customarily divided into the following three historical stages:

Old Gujarati

Old Gujarātī (1200 CE–1500 CE), the ancestor of modern Gujarati and Rajasthani, was spoken by the Gurjars, who were residing and ruling in Gujarat, Punjab, Rajputana, and central India. The language was used as literary language as early as the 12th century. Texts of this era display characteristic Gujarati features such as direct/oblique noun forms, postpositions, and auxiliary verbs. It had three genders, as Gujarati does today, and by around the time of 1300 CE, a fairly standardized form of this language emerged. While generally known as Old Gujarati, some scholars prefer the name Old Western Rajasthani, based upon the argument that Gujarati and Rajasthani were not yet distinct. Factoring into this preference was the belief that modern Rajasthani sporadically expressed a neuter gender, based on the incorrect conclusion that the [ũ] that came to be pronounced in some areas for masculine [o] after a nasal consonant was analogous to Gujarati's neuter [ũ]. A formal grammar, Prakrita Vyakarana, of the precursor to this language, Gurjar Apabhraṃśa, was written by Jain monk and eminent scholar Acharya Hemachandra Suri in the reign of Chaulukya king Jayasimha Siddharaja of Anhilwara (Patan).

Middle Gujarati

Modern Gujarati (1800–present)

A major phonological change was the deletion of final ə, such that the modern language has consonant-final words. Grammatically, a new plural marker of -o developed. In literature, the third quarter of the 19th century saw a series of milestones for Gujarati, which previously had verse as its dominant mode of literary composition. In 1920s, the efforts to standardise Gujarati were carried out.

Demographics and distribution 

Of the approximately  million speakers of Gujarati in 2022, roughly  million resided in India, 250,000 in Tanzania,  in Kenya and by thousands in Pakistan. Many Gujarati speakers in Pakistan are shifting to Urdu. However, Gujarati community leaders in Pakistan claim that there are 3 million Gujarati speakers in Karachi. Elsewhere in Pakistan, Gujarati is also spoken in Lower Punjab. Pakistani Gujarati is probably a dialect of Gamadia.

Mahatma Gandhi used Gujarati to serve as a medium of literary expression. He helped to inspire a renewal in its literature, and in 1936 he introduced the current spelling convention at the Gujarati Literary Society's 12th meeting.

Some Mauritians and many Réunion islanders are of Gujarati descent and some of them still speak Gujarati.

A considerable Gujarati-speaking population exists in North America, especially in the New York City Metropolitan Area and in the Greater Toronto Area, which have over 100,000 speakers and over 75,000 speakers, respectively, but also throughout the major metropolitan areas of the United States and Canada. According to the 2016 census, Gujarati is the fourth most-spoken South Asian language in Toronto after Hindustani, Punjabi and Tamil.

The UK has over 200,000 speakers, many of them situated in the London area, especially in North West London, but also in Birmingham, Manchester, and in Leicester, Coventry, Rugby, Bradford and the former mill towns within Lancashire. A portion of these numbers consists of East African Gujaratis who, under increasing discrimination and policies of Africanisation in their newly independent resident countries (especially Uganda, where Idi Amin expelled 50,000 Asians), were left with uncertain futures and citizenships. Most, with British passports, settled in the UK. Gujarati is offered as a GCSE subject for students in the UK.

Some Gujarati parents in the diaspora are not comfortable with the possibility that their children will not be fluent in the language. In a study, 80% of Malayali parents felt that "Children would be better off with English", compared to 36% of Kannada parents and only 19% of Gujarati parents.

Besides being spoken by the Gujarati people, many non-Gujarati residents of Gujarat also speak it, among them the Kutchis (as a literary language), the Parsis (adopted as a mother tongue), and Hindu Sindhi refugees from Pakistan.

Official status 
Gujarati is one of the twenty-two official languages and fourteen regional languages of India, and one of the minority languages of neighboring Pakistan. It is officially recognised in the state of Gujarat and the union territory of Dadra and Nagar Haveli and Daman and Diu.

Gujarati is recognised and taught as a minority language in the states of Rajasthan, Madhya Pradesh, Maharashtra, and Tamil Nadu and the union territory of Delhi.

Dialects 
According to British historian and philologist William Tisdall, who was an early scholar of Gujarati grammar, three major varieties of Gujarati exist: a standard 'Hindu' dialect, a 'Parsi' dialect and a 'Muslim' dialect.

However, Gujarati has undergone contemporary reclassification with respect to the widespread regional differences in vocabulary and phrasing; notwithstanding the number of poorly attested dialects and regional variations in naming.

 Standard Gujarati: this forms something of a standardised variant of Gujarati across news, education and government. It is also spoken in pockets of Maharashtra. The varieties of it include Mumbai Gujarati, Nagari.
Saurashtra: spoken primarily by the Saurashtrians who migrated from the Lata region of present-day Gujarat to Southern India in the Middle Ages. Saurashtra is closely related to Gujarati and the older dialects of Rajasthani and Sindhi. The script of this language is derived from the Devanagari script and shares similarities with modern-day Gujarati.
 Amdawadi Gujarati: spoken primarily in Ahmedabad and the surrounding regions, in addition to Bharuch and Surat, where it is colloquially known as 'Surati'. The varieties of it include Ahmedabad Gamadia, Anawla, Brathela, Charotari, Eastern Broach Gujarati, Gramya, Patani, Patidari, Surati, Vadodari.
 Kathiawari: a distinctive variant spoken primarily in the Kathiawar region and subject to significant Sindhi influence. The varieties of it include Bhavnagari, Gohilwadi, Holadi/Halari, Jhalawadi, Sorathi.

Kharwa, Kakari and Tarimuki (Ghisadi) are also often cited as additional varieties of Gujarati.

 Parsi: spoken by the Zoroastrian Parsi minority. This highly distinctive variety has been subject to considerable lexical influence by Avestan, the liturgical Zoroastrian language.
 Lisan ud-Dawat: spoken primarily by Gujarati Muslim Bohra communities, it has been subject to greater lexical influence by Arabic and Persian and is written in the Arabic script.

Kutchi is often referred to as a dialect of Gujarati, but most linguists consider it closer to Sindhi. In addition, the Memoni is related to Gujarati, albeit distantly.

Furthermore, words used by the native languages of areas where the Gujarati people have become a diaspora community, such as East Africa (Swahili), have become loanwords in local dialects of Gujarati.

The Linguistic Survey of India noted nearly two dozen dialects of Gujarati: Standard, Old, Standard Ahmedabad, Standard Broach, Nāgarī, Bombay, Suratī, Anāvla or Bhāṭelā, Eastern Broach, Pārsī, Carotarī, Pāṭīdārī, Vaḍodarī, Gāmaḍiā of Ahmedabad, Paṭanī, Thar and Parkar, Cutch, Kāṭhiyāvāḍī, Musalmān (Vhorāsī and Kharwā), Paṭṇulī, Kākarī, and Tārīmukī or Ghisāḍī.

Phonology

Vowels

Consonants

Writing system 

Similar to other Nāgarī writing systems, the Gujarati script is an abugida. It is used to write the Gujarati and Kutchi languages. It is a variant of the Devanāgarī script, differentiated by the loss of the characteristic horizontal line running above the letters and by a small number of modifications in the remaining characters.

Vocabulary

Categorisation and sources
These are the three general categories of words in modern Indo-Aryan: tadbhav, tatsam, and loanwords.

Tadbhav
 tadbhava, "of the nature of that". Gujarati is a modern Indo-Aryan language descended from Sanskrit (old Indo-Aryan), and this category pertains exactly to that: words of Sanskritic origin that have demonstratively undergone change over the ages, ending up characteristic of modern Indo-Aryan languages specifically as well as in general. Thus the "that" in "of the nature of that" refers to Sanskrit. They tend to be non-technical, everyday, crucial words; part of the spoken vernacular. Below is a table of a few Gujarati tadbhav words and their Old Indo-Aryan sources:

Tatsam
 tatsama, "same as that". While Sanskrit eventually stopped being spoken vernacularly, in that it changed into Middle Indo-Aryan, it was nonetheless standardised and retained as a literary and liturgical language for long after. This category consists of these borrowed words of (more or less) pure Sanskrit character. They serve to enrich Gujarati and modern Indo-Aryan in its formal, technical, and religious vocabulary. They are recognisable by their Sanskrit inflections and markings; they are thus often treated as a separate grammatical category unto themselves.

Many old tatsam words have changed their meanings or have had their meanings adopted for modern times. પ્રસારણ prasāraṇ means "spreading", but now it is used for "broadcasting". In addition to this are neologisms, often being calques. An example is telephone, which is Greek for "far talk", translated as દુરભાષ durbhāṣ. Most people, though, just use ફોન phon and thus neo-Sanskrit has varying degrees of acceptance.

So, while having unique tadbhav sets, modern IA languages have a common, higher tatsam pool. Also, tatsams and their derived tadbhavs can also co-exist in a language; sometimes of no consequence and at other times with differences in meaning:

What remains are words of foreign origin (videśī), as well as words of local origin that cannot be pegged as belonging to any of the three prior categories (deśaj). The former consists mainly of Persian, Arabic, and English, with trace elements of Portuguese and Turkish. While the phenomenon of English loanwords is relatively new, Perso-Arabic has a longer history behind it. Both English and Perso-Arabic influences are quite nationwide phenomena, in a way paralleling tatsam as a common vocabulary set or bank. What's more is how, beyond a transposition into general Indo-Aryan, the Perso-Arabic set has also been assimilated in a manner characteristic and relevant to the specific Indo-Aryan language it is being used in, bringing to mind tadbhav.

Perso-Arabic

India was ruled for many centuries by Persian-speaking Muslims, amongst the most notable being the Delhi Sultanate, and the Mughal dynasty. As a consequence Indian languages were changed greatly, with the large scale entry of Persian and its many Arabic loans into the Gujarati lexicon. One fundamental adoption was Persian's conjunction "that", ke. Also, while tatsam or Sanskrit is etymologically continuous to Gujarati, it is essentially of a differing grammar (or language), and that in comparison while Perso-Arabic is etymologically foreign, it has been in certain instances and to varying degrees grammatically indigenised. Owing to centuries of situation and the end of Persian education and power, (1) Perso-Arabic loans are quite unlikely to be thought of or known as loans, and (2) more importantly, these loans have often been Gujarati-ized. dāvo – claim, fāydo – benefit, natījo – result, and hamlo – attack, all carry Gujarati's masculine gender marker, o. khānũ – compartment, has the neuter ũ. Aside from easy slotting with the auxiliary karvũ, a few words have made a complete transition of verbification: kabūlvũ – to admit (fault), kharīdvũ – to buy, kharǎcvũ – to spend (money), gujarvũ – to pass. The last three are definite part and parcel.

Below is a table displaying a number of these loans. Currently some of the etymologies are being referenced to an Urdu dictionary so that Gujarati's singular masculine o corresponds to Urdu ā, neuter ũ groups into ā as Urdu has no neuter gender, and Urdu's Persian z is not upheld in Gujarati and corresponds to j or jh. In contrast to modern Persian, the pronunciation of these loans into Gujarati and other Indo-Aryan languages, as well as that of Indian-recited Persian, seems to be in line with Persian spoken in Afghanistan and Central Asia, perhaps 500 years ago.

Lastly, Persian, being part of the Indo-Iranian language family as Sanskrit and Gujarati are, met up in some instances with its cognates:

Zoroastrian Persian refugees known as Parsis also speak an accordingly Persianized form of Gujarati.

English

With the end of Perso-Arabic inflow, English became the current foreign source of new vocabulary. English had and continues to have a considerable influence over Indian languages. Loanwords include new innovations and concepts, first introduced directly through British colonial rule, and then streaming in on the basis of continued Anglophone dominance in the Republic of India. Besides the category of new ideas is the category of English words that already have Gujarati counterparts which end up replaced or existed alongside with. The major driving force behind this latter category has to be the continuing role of English in modern India as a language of education, prestige, and mobility. In this way, Indian speech can be sprinkled with English words and expressions, even switches to whole sentences. See Hinglish, Code-switching.

In matters of sound, English alveolar consonants map as retroflexes rather than dentals. Two new characters were created in Gujarati to represent English /æ/'s and /ɔ/'s. Levels of Gujarati-ization in sound vary. Some words do not go far beyond this basic transpositional rule, and sound much like their English source, while others differ in ways, one of those ways being the carrying of dentals. See Indian English.

As English loanwords are a relatively new phenomenon, they adhere to English grammar, as tatsam words adhere to Sanskrit. That is not to say that the most basic changes have been underway: many English words are pluralised with Gujarati o over English "s". Also, with Gujarati having three genders, genderless English words must take one. Though often inexplicable, gender assignment may follow the same basis as it is expressed in Gujarati: vowel type, and the nature of word meaning.

1 These English forms are often used (prominently by NRIs) for those family friends and elders that are not actually uncles and aunts but are of the age.

Portuguese
The smaller foothold the Portuguese had in wider India had linguistic effects. Gujarati took up a number of words, while elsewhere the influence was great enough to the extent that creole languages came to be (see Portuguese India, Portuguese-based creole languages in India and Sri Lanka). Comparatively, the impact of Portuguese has been greater on coastal languages and their loans tend to be closer to the Portuguese originals.

1 "To stretch (out)".
2 Common occupational surname.
3 "Master".

Loans into English
Bungalow—

Coolie—

Tank—

Grammar

Gujarati is a head-final, or left-branching language. Adjectives precede nouns, direct objects come before verbs, and there are postpositions. The word order of Gujarati is SOV, and there are three genders and two numbers. There are no definite or indefinite articles. A verb is expressed with its verbal root followed by suffixes marking aspect and agreement in what is called a main form, with a possible proceeding auxiliary form derived from to be, marking tense and mood, and also showing agreement. Causatives (up to double) and passives have a morphological basis.

Sample text

Gujarati script—
ગાંધીજીની ઝૂંપડી-કરાડી

જગ પ્રસિદ્ધ દાંડી કૂચ પછી ગાંધીજીએ અહીં આંબાના વૃક્ષ નીચે ખજૂરી નાં છટિયાંની એક ઝૂંપડીમાં તા.૧૪-૪-૧૯૩૦ થી તા.૪-૫-૧૯૩૦ સુધી નિવાસ કર્યો હતો. દાંડીમાં છઠ્ઠી એપ્રિલે શરૂ કરેલી નિમક કાનૂન (મીઠાના સત્યાગ્રહ) ભંગની લડતને તેમણે અહીંથી વેગ આપી દેશ વ્યાપી બનાવી હતી. અહીંથી જ તેમણે ધરાસણાના મીઠાના અગરો તરફ કૂચ કરવાનો પોતાનો સંકલ્પ બ્રિટિશ વાઈસરૉયને પત્ર લખીને જણાવ્યો હતો.

તા.૪ થી મે ૧૯૩૦ની રાતના બાર વાગ્યા પછી આ સ્થળેથી બ્રિટિશ સરકારે તેમની ધરપકડ કરી હતી.
Devanagari script –
गांधीजीनी झूंपडी-कराडी

जग प्रसिद्ध दांडी कूच पछी गांधीजीए अहीं आंबाना वृक्ष नीचे खजूरीनां छटियांनी एक झूंपडीमां ता.१४-४-१९३०थी ता.४-५-१९३० सुधी निवास कर्यो हतो. दांडीमां छठ्ठी एप्रिले शरू करेली निमक कानून भंगनी लडतने तेमणे अहींथी वेग आपी देश व्यापी बनावी हती. अहींथीज तेमणे धरासणाना मीठाना अगरो तरफ कूच करवानो पोतानो संकल्प ब्रिटिश वाईसरॉयने पत्र लखीने जणाव्यो हतो.

ता.४थी मे १९३०नी रातना बार वाग्या पछी आ स्थळेथी ब्रिटिश सरकारे तेमनी धरपकड करी हती. 
Transliteration (IAST)—

Transcription (IPA)—

Simple gloss—

gandhiji's hut-karadi

world famous dandi march after gandhiji here mango's tree under palm date's bark's one hut-in date.14-4-1930-from date.4-5-1930 until residence done was. dandi-in sixth April-at started done salt law break's fight (-to) he here-from speed gave country wide made was. here-from he dharasana's salt's mounds towards march doing's self's resolve British viceroy-to letter written-having notified was.

date.4-from May 1930's night's twelve struck after this place-at-from British government his arrest done was.

Transliteration and detailed gloss—
{| class="wikitable" style="text-align:center"
||gāndhījī-n-ī||jhū̃pṛ-ī-∅||Karāṛī
|-
||gandhiji–GEN–FEM||hut–FEM–SG||karadi
|}

{| class="wikitable" style="text-align:center"
||jag||prasiddh||dāṇḍī||kūc||pachī||gāndhījī-e||ahī̃||āmb-ā-∅-n-ā||vṛkṣ||nīce
|-
||world||famous||dandi||march||after||gandhiji–ERG||here||mango–MASC.OBL–SG–GEN–MASC.OBL ||tree||under
|}

{| class="wikitable" style="text-align:center"
||khajūr-ī-∅-n-ā̃||chaṭiy-ā̃-n-ī||ek||jhū̃pṛ-ī-∅-mā̃||tā.||14 4 1930thī||tā.||rowspan="2"|4 5 1930||sudhī
|-
||palmdate–FEM–SG–GEN–NEUT.OBL||bark–NEUT.PL.OBL–GEN–FEM.OBL||one
|hut–FEM–SG–in||date||14 4 1930–from||date||until
|}

{| class="wikitable" style="text-align:center"
||nivās||kar-y-o||ha-t-o||rowspan="2"|.||dāṇḍī-mā̃||chaṭhṭhī||epril-e||śarū||kar-el-ī||nimak
|-
||residence.MASC.SG.OBJ.NOM||do–PERF–MASC.SG
|be–PAST–MASC.SG||dandi–in||sixth||April–at||started
|do–PAST.PTCP–FEM||salt
|}

{| class="wikitable" style="text-align:center"
||kānūn||bhaṅg-n-ī||laṛat-∅-ne||te-m-ṇe||ahī̃-thī||veg||āp-ī||deś||vyāpī
|-
||law||break–GEN–FEM.OBL||fight.FEM.OBJ–SG–ACC
|3.DIST–HONORIFIC–ERG||here–from||speed–OBJ
|give–CONJUNCTIVE||country||wide
|}

{| class="wikitable" style="text-align:center"
||ban-āv-∅-ī||ha-t-ī||rowspan="2"|.||ahī̃-thī-j||te-m-ṇe||dharāsaṇā-n-ā
|-
||become–CAUS–PERF–FEM||be–PAST–FEM||here–from–INTENSIFIER
|3.DIST–HONORIFIC–ERG||dharasana–GEN–MASC.PL
|}

{| class="wikitable" style="text-align:center"
||mīṭh-ā-n-ā||agar-o||taraph||kūc||kar-v-ā-n-o||potā-n-o
|-
||salt–NEUT.SG.OBL–GEN–MASC.PL||mound.MASC–PL||towards
|march.MASC.SG||do–INF–OBL–GEN–MASC.SG
|REFL–GEN–MASC.SG
|}

{| class="wikitable" style="text-align:center"
||saṅkalp||briṭiś||vāīsarôy-∅-ne||patra||lakh-īne||jaṇ-āv-y-o||ha-t-o||rowspan="2"|.||tā.
|-
||resolve.MASC.SG.OBJ.ACC||British||viceroy.OBJ–SG–DAT
|letter||write–CONJUNCTIVE||know–CAUS–PERF–MASC.SG
|be–PAST–MASC.SG||date
|}

{| class="wikitable" style="text-align:center"
||4-thī||me||1930-n-ī||rāt-∅-n-ā||bār||vāg-y-ā||pachī||ā||sthaḷ-e-thī||briṭiś
|-
||4-th||may||1930–GEN–FEM.OBL||night.FEM–SG–GEN–MASC.OBL
|twelve||strike–PERF–OBL||after||3.PROX
|place–at–from||British
|}

{| class="wikitable" style="text-align:center"
||sarkār-e||te-m-n-ī||dharpakaṛ||kar-∅-ī||ha-t-ī||rowspan="2"|.
|-
||government–ERG||3.DIST–HONORIFIC–GEN–FEM
|arrest.FEM.SG.OBJ.ACC||do–PERF–FEM||be–PAST–FEM
|}

Translation—

Gandhiji's hut-Karadi

After the world-famous Dandi March Gandhiji resided here in a date palm bark hut underneath a/the mango tree, from 14-4-1930 to 4-5-1930. From here he gave speed to and spread country-wide the anti-Salt Law struggle, started in Dandi on 6 April. From here, writing in a letter, he notified the British Viceroy of his resolve of marching towards the salt mounds of Dharasana.

The British government arrested him at this location, after twelve o'clock on the night of 4 May 1930.

Translation (provided at location)—

Gandhiji's hut-Karadi

Here under the mango tree in the hut made of palm leaves (khajoori) Gandhiji stayed from 14-4-1930 to 4-5-1930 after the world famous Dandi march. From here he gave impetus to the civil disobedience movement for breaking the salt act started on 6 April at Dandi and turned it into a nationwide movement. It was also from this place that he wrote a letter to the British viceroy expressing his firm resolve to march to the salt works at Dharasana.

This is the place from where he was arrested by the British government after midnight on 4 May 1930.

See also

 Gujarati journalism
 Gujarati literature
 Lisaan ud-Da'wat il-'Alaviyah (Language of Alavi Bohras)
 Lists of Gujarati-language writers
 Old Gujarati language
 rathwi Bareli

References

Bibliography 
 
 Belsare, M.B. (1904) An etymological Gujarati-English Dictionary.
 Deshpande, P.G. & Parnwell, E.C. (1977) Oxford Picture Dictionary. English-Gujarati. Oxford University Press.
 Mehta, B.N. & Mehta, B.B. (1925) The Modern Gujarati-English Dictionary.
 Suthar, B. (2003) Gujarati-English Learner's Dictionary (1 Mb)
 Waghmar, Burzine (2009). Gujarati. In Keith Brown and Sarah Ogilvie (eds.), Concise Encyclopedia of the Languages of the World. Oxford: Elsevier, pp. 468–469. 
.
.
.
.
.
.
 .
.
 .

External links 

  
 Gujarati language at Encyclopædia Britannica   
 Gujarati Online Dictionary & Language Resources
 Bharatiya Bhasha Jyoti: Gujarati—a textbook for learning Gujarati through Hindi from the Central Institute of Indian Languages.
 English to Gujarati Dictionary

 
Gujarati literature
Indo-Aryan languages
Subject–object–verb languages
Official languages of India
Languages of India
Languages of Gujarat
Languages of Maharashtra
Languages of Madhya Pradesh
Languages of Rajasthan
Languages of Pakistan
Languages of Sindh
Languages of Tanzania
Languages of Uganda
Languages of Canada
Languages of Kenya
Languages of the United Kingdom
Languages of the United States
Languages of South Africa
Languages of Australia
Languages with own distinct writing systems
Languages officially written in Indic scripts
Sahitya Akademi recognised languages